Operation Sicilian Vespers could refer to one of the following: 
Operation Sicilian Vespers (1992-1998), the largest Italian Army homeland security operation since the end of the Second World War
Operation Sicilian Vespers (2012), the code name of the 5 days long blockade of roads and seaports that brought Sicily to a standstill in January 2012
The name of the above operations refers to the Sicilian Vespers, the thirteenth century successful rebellion against the rule of the Angevins

it:Operazione Vespri siciliani
scn:Opirazzioni Vespri siciliani